Nickelodeon Junior is a French 24-hour television channel broadcasting to France and Switzerland for a toddler audience. It is the French equivalent of Nick Jr., though with its French branding meeting domestic language policies, along with "Nick" sounding similar to a French profanity.

The French language Belgium version is called simply Nick Jr.

The channel was first announced on 26 November 2009. At launch, it used an ident package similar to the one used on the American Nick Jr. channel (months before the other international Nick Jr. feeds did so), although Moose and Zee were not present on the French version of the network. 

On 24 May 2012, Nickelodeon Junior started broadcasting in 16:9 widescreen.

On 22 September 2015, Nickelodeon Junior HD was launched.

In 2019 and 2020, Nickelodeon channels were launched on French ISP bouquets, ending their exclusivity on Canal+.

In January 2021, Nickelodeon Junior was added to the Canal+ systems in Caledonia, the Caribbean and the French-speaking territories in Madagascar and the Indian Ocean, and shortly after in Sub-Saharan Africa.

References

External links
 nickelodeonjunior.fr

France
Television stations in France
Television stations in Switzerland
2010 establishments in France
Television channels and stations established in 2010
French-language television stations